Hugo Dellien Jr. (born 16 June 1993) is a Bolivian professional tennis player. He has a career-high ATP singles ranking of No. 64, achieved on 1 August 2022. He is the current No. 1 Bolivian tennis player. He also has a career-high ATP doubles ranking of No. 185 achieved on 2 February 2015. In juniors, Dellien had a career-high combined ranking of No. 2 in March 2011.

Professional career

2019-21: ATP, Major debuts and first wins, Olympics debut
He made his ATP debut at the 2019 Córdoba Open as a lucky loser.

At the 2019 Rio Open, Dellien defeated Carlos Berlocq in qualifying competition, Guido Andreozzi in the first round, and Roberto Carballés Baena in the second to reach the quarterfinals. Hugo became the first Bolivian player with an ATP win since Mario Martínez at the French Open in 1984, trailing 3–1 in both sets before performing a comeback against Andreozzi to secure a historic achievement for both him and his country.

2022: Top 65 debut
At the 2022 French Open he defeated Dominic Thiem to reach his second Rolland Garros second round. He reached a new career-high ranking of No. 64 on 1 August 2022.

2023: First ATP semifinal, Struggling with form, out of top 100

At the 2023 Córdoba Open, Argentina he reached again the quarterfinals as a qualifier defeating two Argentines, fifth seed Pedro Cachín and Guido Pella. Next he defeated 2021 champion Argentine Juan Manuel Cerundolo in three sets to reach his first ATP semifinal in his career. 
At the same tournament partnering in doubles with Pella, he lost to Nicolas Barrientos/Ariel Behar in a close match.

At the 2023 Rio Open he reached the quarterfinals for a second time in four years at this tournament using a protected ranking with a win over 9th seed Alex Molčan in the round of 16. As a result he moved back into the top 100. 

Due to struggling with form, he is out of the top 100 again. Because of an ongoing protest related to tennis in Bolivia, he has failed to participate in tournaments and withdrawn from others as of March 20th, 2023.

National representation
Dellien qualified to represent Bolivia at the 2020 Summer Olympics.

Dellien has represented Bolivia at the Davis Cup with a W/L record of 26–10.

Personal life
His younger brother Murkel Dellien is also a tennis player who currently plays at Wichita State University.

Dellien owned an ice cream business alongside his father, Hugo Sr., purchased with some of his early career earnings.

Dellien is married to retired tennis player Liz Camila Giangreco Campiz; the couple share a daughter.

Grand Slam performance timelines

Singles
Current after the 2022 US Open.

Doubles

Challenger and Futures finals

Singles: 35 (25 titles, 10 runner-ups)

Doubles: 37 (18 titles, 19 runner-ups)

Davis Cup

Participations: (26–10)

   indicates the outcome of the Davis Cup match followed by the score, date, place of event, the zonal classification and its phase, and the court surface.

Record against top 10 players
Dellien's match record against those who have been ranked in the top 10 is as follows (former #1 in bold):

  Gilles Simon 1–0
  Janko Tipsarević 1–0
  Novak Djokovic 0–1
  Daniil Medvedev 0–1
  Rafael Nadal 0–1
  Kei Nishikori 0–1
  Stefanos Tsitsipas 0–1
  Alexander Zverev 0–2
  Dominic Thiem 1–0

*As of 24 May 2022.

Notes

References

External links
 
 
 

1993 births
Living people
Bolivian male tennis players
People from Trinidad, Bolivia
Tennis players from Buenos Aires
Tennis players at the 2015 Pan American Games
Pan American Games competitors for Bolivia
Tennis players at the 2010 Summer Youth Olympics
Tennis players at the 2020 Summer Olympics
Olympic tennis players of Bolivia